Nicula is a Romanian surname. Notable people with the surname include:

Claudia Nicula, Romanian sprint canoer
Daniel Nicula, Romanian footballer
Emilian Nicula

See also
Nicula, a village in Fizeșu Gherlii Commune, Cluj County, Romania 
Nicula Monastery

Romanian-language surnames